All India Institute of Medical Sciences Bhopal (AIIMS Bhopal) is a medical research public university and Institute of National Importance, located in the Saket Nagar suburb of Bhopal, Madhya Pradesh, India. It is one of the All India Institutes of Medical Sciences (AIIMS) established by the Ministry of Health and Family Welfare under the Pradhan Mantri Swasthya Suraksha Yojna (PMSSY).
Aiims Bhopal Recruitment process under Aiims Delhi conducted a combined exam that is NORCET. First exam Norcet conducted in 2020 and second norcet 2021 also done and third Norcet exam held on 11th September 2022.

History
In 2003, Central government decided to set up new AIIMS at Rishikesh, Bhopal, Patna, Jodhpur, Bhubaneswar and Raipur[4] Though the announcement was made in 2003 during Atal Bihari Vajpayee's tenure,[12] the project was delayed owing to the power shift at the centre. AIIMS Bhopal launched its first academic department, community and family medicine (CFM) in September 2012, (47% construction complete opening time) formed its Institute Body (IB), in July 2013 and started post graduation courses in January 2017.

A BSL3 lab was set up in 2019.

See also
 Education in India
 List of medical colleges in India

References

External links 
 

Bhopal
Medical colleges in Madhya Pradesh
Universities in Bhopal
Educational institutions established in 2012
2012 establishments in Madhya Pradesh
BSL3 laboratories in India